Nantucket High School is a public high school in Nantucket, Massachusetts, United States. It is the only high school on the island of Nantucket. The school serves students in grades 9–12 and has an approximate enrollment of 530 students. The school colors are Navy Blue and White, and the mascot is Hank the Harpoon Man, whose name was chosen by the students in 2013.

History

In 1838, Nantucket High School (NHS) was founded with Cyrus Peirce as the school's first principal. The school's team's name Whalers is in tribute to the long and storied history of the commercial whaling industry on Nantucket. Nantucket is regarded as one of the most recognizable and synonymous places associated with Whaling in the world.

In 2019, NHS graduated its largest class in the school's history with 136 students.

Athletics

The Nantucket High School athletic teams are known as the Whalers. There are currently five boys' teams (soccer, basketball, swimming, lacrosse, and baseball), six girls' teams (softball, basketball, swimming, lacrosse, volleyball, and soccer), and six coed teams (football, field hockey, ice hockey, cheerleading, golf, sailing, and cross country).

There is the skeleton of a juvenile finback whale hanging in the commons area of Nantucket High School that serves as the team's mascot. The Nantucket girls' athletic teams are known as the Lady Whalers, but now commonly known as just the Whalers.

Football

The Nantucket football team is the schools most successful athletics team and is further regarded as one of the most successful small-school programs in Massachusetts. They have won a total of 4 Massachusetts State Championships. The Whalers won state championships in 1980, 1995, 1996, and 2011. Also, they were State Finalists in 1982, 1983, 1990, 1993, 1994 and 1998. The Nantucket Football team has appeared in the MIAA state Championship game a total of 10 times since 1980.

Nantucket's football team was led by legendary coach Vito Capizzo for 45 years, from 1964 to 2009. Capizzo coached the team to 293 wins (3rd most in Massachusetts history), won 3 State Championships, appeared in 9 State Championship games, won 17 League Championships, and was named Coach of the Year numerous times by many publications. In 2011, Nantucket won its first state championship in fifteen years with a 35–0 rout over Latin Academy (Dorchester, MA).

Every year, the Nantucket football team plays against Martha's Vineyard for the Island Cup on the weekend before Thanksgiving. The Island Cup is played on Nantucket one year, then on Martha's Vineyard the next year and alternates back and forth.

Other sports

The Nantucket boys' lacrosse team appeared in the state championship game consecutively for over a decade from 1999 onward.

Veritas

The school newspaper, Veritas, won 14 awards at the 2013 New England Scholastic Press Association ceremony. The paper took the All New England Award for best overall. Traditionally, the Veritas staff has numbered between 30 and 50 students.

Due to coronavirus, Veritas is currently publishing its articles online at veritasnantucket.com

References

External links
 Nantucket High School
 Nantucket Public Schools
 Great Schools Profile

Schools in Nantucket, Massachusetts
Buildings and structures in Nantucket, Massachusetts
Public high schools in Massachusetts